Historic Concerts is a live album by Cecil Taylor and Max Roach recorded at the McMillin Theatre, Columbia University, NYC on December 15, 1979, and released on the Soul Note label in 1984. Despite the inaccurate plural title, the entire album is just one single show. The album features solo and duet performances by Taylor and Roach and the later CD reissue adds interviews recorded after the concert.

Years later, Taylor reflected: "It was a phenomenon, playing with Mr Roach in front of all those people. Ten thousand of them listening to two of us. It was as if two angry prophets had finally managed to get together a crowd. We maybe wondered for a moment whether it would be more eloquent to stay quiet!"

On June 4, 2000, Taylor and Roach reunited at Columbia for a performance during the Bell Atlantic Jazz Festival.

Reception 

In a review of the concert, Robert Palmer wrote: "One anticipated the evening with special interest because Mr. Roach, the most creative and adventurous drummer to emerge from the first generation of modern jazz in the 1940's, would be working with the premier jazz pianist of the 60's, and because Mr. Taylor has often been exceptionally demanding in his encounters with other artists... Mr. Roach demonstrated once more that he is the most musical of all drummers, and Mr. Taylor proved himself a master of space, color, and rhythmic nuance. And the two musicians listened and worked together."

The Allmusic review by Scott Yanow states: "The passionate music is quite atonal but coherent, with Taylor displaying an impressive amount of energy and the two masters (who had not rehearsed or ever played together before) communicating pretty well".

The authors of the Penguin Jazz Guide wrote: "the summit with Taylor, recorded at the McMillin Theater at Columbia University, is still exhilarating. Both men warm up in their respective corners, before launching into a huge, 40-minute fantasy that sees neither surrendering a whit of individuality. As was noted at the time, it was the perfect occasion to test the cliché about Roach the melodic percussionist and Taylor the percussive pianist and, like all successful sound-bites, it proves to be both helpful and misleading. For much of the opening duet, Roach fulfils a conventional drummer's role, sustaining a time-feel, accelerating and arresting the pace of development, filling and embellishing; it is Taylor who creates the grandly insane melodies that spring away for whole minutes at a time... a valuable historical document."

Track listing 
All compositions by Cecil Taylor & Max Roach.
 "Presentation" - 1:06  
 "Drums Solo" - 5:02  
 "Piano Solo" - 5:04  
 "Duets, Part 1" - 40:04  
 "Duets, Part 2" - 38:32  
 "Interviews, Part 1" - 9:36  
 "Interviews, Part 2" - 7:14  
Recorded at the McMillin Theatre, Columbia University, NYC on December 15, 1979

Personnel 
 Cecil Taylor – piano
 Max Roach – drums

References 

Max Roach live albums
1979 live albums
Cecil Taylor live albums
Black Saint/Soul Note live albums